Dudael (Heb. דּוּדָאֵל, compd. of dud דּוּד "kettle", "cauldron", "pot" + El אֵל "deity", "divinity" — lit. "cauldron of God") is the place of imprisonment for Azazel (one of the "fallen" angels), cohort of Samyaza. It is described in the Book of Enoch chapter 10 verses 4–7:

Dudael is also implied to be the prison of all the fallen angels, especially the evil Watchers, the entrance of which is located to the east of Jerusalem. The way this place is described, Dudael is sometimes considered as a region of the underworld, comparable to Tartarus or Gehenna.

See also
 Christian views on Hades
 Hell
 Intermediate state
 Lake of fire
 Revelation 20
 Sheol

References

Bibliography
Bautch, K. C. (2003).  A Study of the Geography of 1 Enoch 17-19: No One Has Seen What I Have Seen. Leiden: Brill.

Book of Enoch
Jewish underworld
Hell (Christianity)